The batch reactor is the generic term for a type of vessel widely used in the process industries. Its name is something of a misnomer since vessels of this type are used for a variety of process operations such as solids dissolution, product mixing, chemical reactions, batch distillation, crystallization, liquid/liquid extraction and polymerization. In some cases, they are not referred to as reactors but have a name which reflects the role they perform (such as crystallizer, or bioreactor).

A typical batch reactor consists of a storage tank with an agitator and integral heating/cooling system. These vessels may vary in size from less than 1 litre to more than 15,000 litres. They are usually fabricated in steel, stainless steel, glass-lined steel, glass or exotic alloy. Liquids and solids are usually charged via connections in the top cover of the reactor.  Vapors and gases also discharge through connections in the top. Liquids are usually discharged out of the bottom.

The advantages of the batch reactor lie with its versatility. A single vessel can carry out a sequence of different operations without the need to break containment. This is particularly useful when processing toxic or highly potent compounds.

Agitation

The usual agitator arrangement is a centrally mounted driveshaft with an overhead drive unit. Impeller blades are mounted on the shaft. A wide variety of blade designs are used and typically the blades cover about two thirds of the diameter of the reactor. Where viscous products are handled, anchor shaped paddles are often used which have a close clearance between the blade and the vessel walls.

Most batch reactors also use baffles. These are stationary blades which break up flow caused by the rotating agitator. These may be fixed to the vessel cover or mounted on the interior of the side walls.

Despite significant improvements in agitator blade and baffle design, mixing in large batch reactors is ultimately constrained by the amount of energy that can be applied. On large vessels, mixing energies of more than 5 Watts per litre can put an unacceptable burden on the cooling system. High agitator loads can also create shaft stability problems. Where mixing is a critical parameter, the batch reactor is not the ideal solution. Much higher mixing rates can be achieved by using smaller flowing systems with high speed agitators, ultrasonic mixing or static mixers.

Heating and cooling systems

Products within batch reactors usually liberate or absorb heat during processing. Even the action of stirring stored liquids generates heat. In order to hold the reactor contents at the desired temperature, heat has to be added or removed by a cooling jacket or cooling pipe. Heating/cooling coils or external jackets are used for heating and cooling batch reactors. Heat transfer fluid passes through the jacket or coils to add or remove heat.

Within the chemical and pharmaceutical industries, external cooling jackets are generally preferred as they make the vessel easier to clean. The performance of these jackets can be defined by 3 parameters:
 response time to modify the jacket temperature
 uniformity of jacket temperature
 stability of jacket temperature.

It can be argued that heat transfer coefficient is also an important parameter. It has to be recognized however that large batch reactors with external cooling jackets have severe heat transfer constraints by virtue of design. It is difficult to achieve better than 100 Watts/litre even with ideal heat transfer conditions. By contrast, continuous reactors can deliver cooling capacities in excess of 10,000 W/litre. For processes with very high heat loads, there are better solutions than batch reactors.

Fast temperature control response and uniform jacket heating and cooling is particularly important for crystallization processes or operations where the product or process is very temperature sensitive. There are several types of batch reactor cooling jackets:

Single external jacket

The single jacket design consists of an outer jacket which surrounds the vessel. Heat transfer fluid flows around the jacket and is injected at high velocity via nozzles. The temperature in the jacket is regulated to control heating or cooling.

The single jacket is probably the oldest design of external cooling jacket. Despite being a tried and tested solution, it has some limitations. On large vessels, it can take many minutes to adjust the temperature of the fluid in the cooling jacket. This results in sluggish temperature control. The distribution of heat transfer fluid is also far from ideal and the heating or cooling tends to vary between the side walls and bottom dish. Another issue to consider is the inlet temperature of the heat transfer fluid which can oscillate (in response to the temperature control valve) over a wide temperature range to cause hot or cold spots at the jacket inlet points.

Half coil jacket

The half coil jacket is made by welding a half pipe around the outside of the vessel to create a semi circular flow channel. The heat transfer fluid passes through the channel in a plug flow fashion. A large reactor may use several coils to deliver the heat transfer fluid. Like the single jacket, the temperature in the jacket is regulated to control heating or cooling.

The plug flow characteristics of a half coil jacket permits faster displacement of the heat transfer fluid in the jacket (typically less than 60 seconds). This is desirable for good temperature control. It also provides good distribution of heat transfer fluid which avoids the problems of non uniform heating or cooling between the side walls and bottom dish. Like the single jacket design however the inlet heat transfer fluid is also vulnerable to large oscillations (in response to the temperature control valve) in temperature.

Constant flux cooling jacket

The constant flux cooling jacket is a relatively recent development. It is not a single jacket but has a series of 20 or more small jacket elements. The temperature control valve operates by opening and closing these channels as required. By varying the heat transfer area in this way, the process temperature can be regulated without altering the jacket temperature.

The constant flux jacket has very fast temperature control response (typically less than 5 seconds) due to the short length of the flow channels and high velocity of the heat transfer fluid. Like the half coil jacket the heating/cooling flux is uniform. Because the jacket operates at substantially constant temperature however the inlet temperature oscillations seen in other jackets are absent. An unusual feature of this type jacket is that process heat can be measured very sensitively. This allows the user to monitor the rate of reaction for detecting end points, controlling addition rates, controlling crystallization etc.

Applications

Batch reactors are often used in the process industry.  Batch reactors also have many laboratory applications, such as small scale production and inducing fermentation for beverage products. They also have many uses in medical production. Batch reactors are generally considered expensive to run, as well as variable product reliability. They are also used for experiments of reaction kinetics, volatiles and thermodynamics. Batch reactors are also highly used in  waste water treatment. They are effective in reducing BOD (biological oxygen demand) of influent untreated water.

See also 

 Chemical reactor
 Continuous reactor

References

External links
Jacketed Vessel Design
Batch Reactor
Lab Glass Reactor

Chemical reactors